Guy Forget and Jakob Hlasek were the defending champions, but Forget did not participate this year.  Hlasek partnered Patrick McEnroe, losing in the quarterfinals.

John Fitzgerald and Anders Järryd won the title, defeating Tom Nijssen and Cyril Suk 7–5, 6–2 in the final.

Seeds
All seeds receive a bye into the second round.

Draw

Finals

Top half

Bottom half

References
Draw

Doubles